Kimihito Nonaka  is a Japanese mixed martial artist. He competed in the Bantamweight and Featherweight division.

Mixed martial arts record

|-
| Loss
| align=center| 6-8-2
| Antonio Banuelos
| TKO (punches)
| FFCF 5: Unleashed
| 
| align=center| 1
| align=center| 1:00
| Mangilao, Guam
| 
|-
| Loss
| align=center| 6-7-2
| Jeff Curran
| Submission (rear-naked choke)
| SB 35: SuperBrawl 35
| 
| align=center| 3
| align=center| 4:35
| Honolulu, Hawaii, United States
| 
|-
| Loss
| align=center| 6-6-2
| Ryota Matsune
| Decision (majority)
| Shooto: 2/23 in Korakuen Hall
| 
| align=center| 3
| align=center| 5:00
| Tokyo, Japan
| 
|-
| Win
| align=center| 6-5-2
| Hiroaki Yoshioka
| Decision (unanimous)
| Shooto: Gig Central 2
| 
| align=center| 3
| align=center| 5:00
| Nagoya, Aichi, Japan
| 
|-
| Win
| align=center| 5-5-2
| Jose Lopez
| Submission (rear naked choke)
| SB 25: SuperBrawl 25
| 
| align=center| 1
| align=center| 2:07
| Honolulu, Hawaii, United States
| 
|-
| Loss
| align=center| 4-5-2
| Stephen Palling
| Decision (unanimous)
| Shooto: To The Top 6
| 
| align=center| 3
| align=center| 5:00
| Tokyo, Japan
| 
|-
| Win
| align=center| 4-4-2
| Mamoru Okochi
| Decision (unanimous)
| Shooto: R.E.A.D. 12
| 
| align=center| 3
| align=center| 5:00
| Tokyo, Japan
| 
|-
| Loss
| align=center| 3-4-2
| Hiroyuki Abe
| Decision (unanimous)
| Shooto: R.E.A.D. 5
| 
| align=center| 2
| align=center| 5:00
| Tokyo, Japan
| 
|-
| Loss
| align=center| 3-3-2
| Naoya Uematsu
| Technical Submission (armbar)
| Shooto: Renaxis 4
| 
| align=center| 3
| align=center| 3:11
| Tokyo, Japan
| 
|-
| Draw
| align=center| 3-2-2
| Naoya Uematsu
| Draw
| Shooto: Las Grandes Viajes 6
| 
| align=center| 2
| align=center| 5:00
| Tokyo, Japan
| 
|-
| Loss
| align=center| 3-2-1
| Masahiro Oishi
| Submission (armbar)
| Shooto: Gig '98 2nd
| 
| align=center| 2
| align=center| 1:18
| Tokyo, Japan
| 
|-
| Win
| align=center| 3-1-1
| Jin Akimoto
| Decision (majority)
| Shooto: Reconquista 3
| 
| align=center| 2
| align=center| 5:00
| Tokyo, Japan
| 
|-
| Win
| align=center| 2-1-1
| Kenzi Daikanyama
| Decision (unanimous)
| Shooto: Gig
| 
| align=center| 2
| align=center| 5:00
| Tokyo, Japan
| 
|-
| Win
| align=center| 1-1-1
| Shinji Arano
| Submission (triangle choke)
| Shooto: Vale Tudo Junction 3
| 
| align=center| 2
| align=center| 1:41
| Tokyo, Japan
| 
|-
| Loss
| align=center| 0-1-1
| Uchu Tatsumi
| Decision (majority)
| Shooto: Vale Tudo Junction 1
| 
| align=center| 3
| align=center| 3:00
| Tokyo, Japan
| 
|-
| Draw
| align=center| 0-0-1
| Masahiro Oishi
| Draw
| Shooto: Tokyo Free Fight
| 
| align=center| 3
| align=center| 3:00
| Tokyo, Japan
|

See also
List of male mixed martial artists

References

External links
 
 Kimihito Nonaka at mixedmartialarts.com
 Kimihito Nonaka at fightmatrix.com

Japanese male mixed martial artists
Bantamweight mixed martial artists
Featherweight mixed martial artists
Living people
Year of birth missing (living people)